Poland competed at the 2002 European Athletics Championships in Munich, Germany, from 6-11 August 2002. A delegation of 55 athletes were sent to represent the country.

Medals

References

European Athletics Championships
2002
Nations at the 2002 European Athletics Championships